Gerald I. Fisher (born July 14, 1950) served an associate judge on the Superior Court of the District of Columbia between 2001 and 2022.

Education and career 
Fisher earned his Bachelor of Arts from College of William and Mary in 1972 and his Juris Doctor from Columbus School of Law in 1978.

After graduating, he clerked for judge J. Walter Yeagley of the D.C. Court of Appeals.

D.C. Superior Court 
President Bill Clinton nominated Fisher on June 26, 2000, to a 15-year term as an associate judge on the Superior Court of the District of Columbia to the seat vacated by Richard A. Levie. On September 13, 2000, the Senate Committee on Homeland Security and Governmental Affairs held a hearing on his nomination. On September 27, 2000, the Committee reported his nomination favorably to the senate floor. On October 26, 2000, the full Senate confirmed his nomination by voice vote. He was sworn in on January 15, 2001. Fisher was submitted for an reappointment in November, 2015 under President Barack Obama. Fisher retired on August 31, 2022.

Academia 
Fisher is a lecturer for Georgetown’s Continuing Legal Education program and has been a faculty member for the Harvard Law School Trial Advocacy Workshop, the California Western University Law School Criminal Trial Advocacy Program, and the Santa Clara University Death Penalty College. He also has taught Evidence at the Peking University School of Transnational Law. Additionally, he has been an adjunct professor at the Law Center since spring 1987.

References

1950 births
Living people
21st-century American judges
College of William & Mary alumni
Columbus School of Law alumni
Judges of the Superior Court of the District of Columbia
People from Newport News, Virginia